A Hong Kong musical tongue twister is a melody rhyme that follow a musical tune. Such tongue twisters are extremely short, and contain some addictive background music. Within Hong Kong culture, they have been classified under the heading of TV theme songs. However, they are not songs written in entirety or featured on any albums. Usually most tunes last no more than 20 seconds. The tunes are used almost exclusively for commercials.

History
The two famous composers who wrote all the twisters and sang them for broadcasts was Wong Jim and Joseph Koo. They were meant to be comedic or cheery in terms of creating a friendly atmosphere for selling the products.  This trend was mostly in the 1960s and 1970s. In one of their last concerts together, they re-sang all their tunes in the performance along with a number of recognizable TV theme songs.  An example of an advertisement was the Capstan cigarette brand.

See also
 Music of Hong Kong

Culture of Hong Kong
Chinese styles of music
Tongue-twisters